Neuvy-le-Barrois is a commune in the Cher department in the Centre-Val de Loire region of France.

Geography
The river forms the border with the departement of Allier.

Population

Sights
 The church of St. Martin, dating from the twelfth century. (Monument Historique)
 The motte of a feudal castle.
 The chateau of Neuvy.
 The chateau of Pey.

Personalities
 Sculptor Jean Baffier (1851-1920) was born here.

See also
Communes of the Cher department

References

External links

Annuaire Mairie website 

Communes of Cher (department)